For other persons named John Gibbons see John Gibbons (disambiguation)

John Eddie Gibbons (April 16, 1922 – June 16, 2008) was an American Negro league pitcher for the 1941 Philadelphia Stars.

A native of Milan, Georgia, Gibbons was the brother of fellow negro leaguer Walter Lee Gibbons. Gibbons died in Tampa, Florida in 2008 at age 86.

References

External links
 and Seamheads
 John Gibbons at Negro Leagues Baseball Museum

1922 births
2008 deaths
Philadelphia Stars players
Baseball players from Georgia (U.S. state)
20th-century African-American sportspeople
Baseball pitchers
21st-century African-American people